"You da Baddest" is a song by American rapper Future featuring Trinidadian-born rapper Nicki Minaj. It was released on July 28, 2017 as the fourth single from Future's sixth studio album, Hndrxx (2017). The song was written by Future and Minaj along with producer Detail and Andre Price, and was produced by Detail and Go Grizzly.

Track listing

Charts

Certifications

Release history

References

2017 songs
2017 singles
Future (rapper) songs
Nicki Minaj songs
Songs written by Future (rapper)
Songs written by Nicki Minaj
Songs written by Detail (record producer)
Song recordings produced by Detail (record producer)
Epic Records singles